Gordonia defluvii is a Gram-positive and non-motile bacterium from the genus Gordonia which has been isolated from activated sludge foams in Australia.

References

External links
Type strain of Gordonia defluvii at BacDive -  the Bacterial Diversity Metadatabase	

Mycobacteriales
Bacteria described in 2006